The 2. Supermag Rally d'Italia Sardinia 2005, the fifth round of the 2005 World Rally Championship season took place from April 29 - May 1, 2005.

Results

Special stages
All dates and times are CEST (UTC+2).

References

External links
 Results at eWRC.com

Sardegna
2005
Rally